Drabus or Drabos was a coastal Greek town in ancient Thrace, on the Thracian Chersonesus.

There have been inconclusive attempts to identify Drabus with Araplus. Drabus' site is tentatively located near Ece Limani, in European Turkey.

See also
Greek colonies in Thrace

References

Populated places in ancient Thrace
Former populated places in Turkey
Greek colonies in the Thracian Chersonese
History of Çanakkale Province